Shannon Izar (born 8 May 1993 in London) is a French rugby union player. She has represented France in both codes of the game. She played at the 2014 Women's Rugby World Cup and at the 2013 Rugby World Cup Sevens.

Izar was a member of the squad that won their fourth Six Nations title in 2014. She was selected as a member of the France women's national rugby sevens team to the 2016 Summer Olympics.

References

External links 
 
 

1993 births
Living people
Rugby union players from London
French female rugby union players
Rugby sevens players at the 2016 Summer Olympics
Olympic rugby sevens players of France
France international rugby sevens players
Rugby sevens players at the 2020 Summer Olympics
Medalists at the 2020 Summer Olympics
Olympic silver medalists for France
Olympic medalists in rugby sevens
France international women's rugby sevens players